Newe is a surname. Notable people with the surname include:

Paul Newe (born 1964), Irish footballer
G. B. Newe (1907–1982), Northern Irish politician
Gerard Newe (1908–1982), Northern Irish politician

See also
Castle Newe
New (surname)